Puke is stomach contents that are discharged involuntarily through the mouth.

Puke may also refer to:

 Puke (EP), the 1991 debut EP by American punk rock band Guttermouth
 HSwMS Puke (19), a Psilander-class destroyer of the Royal Swedish Navy from 1940 to 1947
 Johan Puke (1726–1756), Swedish military officer know for his role in the Coup of 1756 and his subsequent execution for treason
 Mont Puke, the highest point of Polynesian French island territory Wallis and Futuna
 Puke Ariki, a combined museum and library in New Plymouth, New Zealand
 Puke Lenden (born 1980), New Zealand professional basketball player
 Puke Puke Express, a former logging railway near Puke Puke, New Zealand
 Pukë District, a district in Albania
 Pukë, a town in Albania
 Te Puke, a town in New Zealand
 Te Puke Te Ao, a Māori member of the House of Representatives, tribal chieftain and farmer
 The ring name of former professional wrestler Darren Drozdov
 "Puke" (Eminem song), a song by Eminem on his 2004 album Encore
 "Puke" (Beast Coast song), a song by Beast Coast on their 2019 album Escape from New York

See also
 Barf (disambiguation)
 Vomit (disambiguation)